Penn Township, Ohio may refer to:
Penn Township, Highland County, Ohio
Penn Township, Morgan County, Ohio

Ohio township disambiguation pages